Anand Pawar (born 18 July 1986) is a male Indian badminton player who has represented India in the Men's World Team Championships (Thomas Cup) & World Mixed Team Championships ( Sudirman Cup ) & Asian Badminton Championships. He is a Bronze Medallist (Semi-Finalist) in the India Super Series 2013 and has been ranked as high as 30 in the world.
In 2008, he won the Portugal International, Hungarian International and the Austrian International. He has also won the Scottish Open in 2010 and 2012 as well as the French International in 2012.
He is the assistant coach of the new Pune7Aces professional badminton team in the Premier Badminton League

Achievements

BWF Grand Prix 
The BWF Grand Prix has two level such as Grand Prix and Grand Prix Gold. It is a series of badminton tournaments, sanctioned by Badminton World Federation (BWF) since 2007.

Men's Singles

 BWF Grand Prix Gold tournament
 BWF Grand Prix tournament

BWF International Challenge/Series
Men's Singles

 BWF International Challenge tournament
 BWF International Series tournament

References

External links 
 

Indian male badminton players
Living people
1986 births
Racket sportspeople from Mumbai